Welsh Hook Halt railway station served the hamlet of Welsh Hook, Pembrokeshire, Wales, from 1924 to 1964 on the Clarbeston Road and Letterston Railway.

History 
The station was opened on 5 May 1924 by the Great Western Railway. Passengers had to stick their hand out at the platform if they wanted to board the train. They also stopped during daylight hours only. The station closed on 6 April 1964.

References

External links 

Disused railway stations in Pembrokeshire
Former Great Western Railway stations
Railway stations in Great Britain opened in 1924
Railway stations in Great Britain closed in 1964
1924 establishments in Wales
1964 disestablishments in Wales
Beeching closures in Wales